Dynamic instability may refer to any of several scientific phenomena:

Aircraft dynamic modes, including aircraft dynamic instability
Atmospheric instability, in meteorology
Dynamic instability of microtubules, in biology
Firehose instability, in astrophysics
Flutter, in aeroelasticity, a branch of mechanics
Hydrodynamic instability, in fluid dynamics
Others in :Category:Fluid dynamic instabilities